Deloneura abri is a butterfly in the family Lycaenidae. It is found in Zanzibar, Tanzania. Its habitat consists of forests.

Adults have been recorded on wing in January.

References

Endemic fauna of Tanzania
Butterflies described in 1998
Deloneura